The Raine Medical Research Foundation funds medical research in Western Australia. It was created from a bequest by Mary Raine to the University of Western Australia (UWA) following the death of her husband, Arnold Yeldham (Joe) Raine in 1957.

History

Establishment
In the mid-1950s, the University of Western Australia launched an appeal for funds to create a medical school, and the Raines were approached directly for a contribution. A donation was made, with the promise of more in future.

In September 1956 Joe suffered a severe stroke caused by arteriosclerosis, resulting in paralysis. After several weeks in hospital, with no sign of recovery, he was moved to room in the Wentworth Hotel, with a hospital bed and a team of nurses to tend him. On 11 February 1957 he suffered a cerebral haemorrhage and died. Mary inherited Joe's estate, worth £153,906, and donated it to the University of WA to establish the Arnold Yeldham and Mary Raine Medical Research Foundation, with the money to be invested and initially used for research into arteriosclerosis.

In 1957 Raine made a new will, leaving small amounts to some friends and family  she had no children of her own  with the bulk of her estate to go the University, for the purposes of finding a cure for the illness that killed Joe. She signed a deed of trust with the University to specify how the estate was to be used after her death, and formalising the donation of Joe's estate.
Raine instructed that none of the money she left was be used for a building or monument in her or Joe's name.

Supported projects 
The foundation financially supports the  Western Australian Pregnancy Cohort (Raine) Study, one of the largest cohorts of pregnancy, childhood, adolescence and  early adulthood to be carried out anywhere in the world.

Notes

References

Further reading

External links
 
  
   

Foundations based in Australia
Organizations established in 1957
1957 establishments in Australia
Organisations based in Western Australia
Medical and health organisations based in Australia